The squad lists for the 2017 CONCACAF U-17 Championship, the continental association football tournament for players under the age of 17.

Group A

Panama
Head coach:  Juan Carlos Cubillas

Honduras
Head coach:  José Francisco Valladares

Curaçao
Head coach:  Ludwig Alberto

Haiti
Head coach:  Rafael Novaes Dias

Group B

Costa Rica
Head coach:  Breansse Camacho

Canada
Head coach:  Paul Stalteri

Cuba
Head coach:  Rufino Sotolongo

Notes

Suriname
Head coach:  Rogillo Kolf

Group C

Mexico
Head coach:  Mario Arteaga

El Salvador
Head coach:  Erick Dowson Prado

Jamaica
Head coach:  Andrew Edwards

United States
Head coach:  John Hackworth

References 

CONCACAF U-17 Championship squads
squads